Abdulrahman al-Akwa'a (born 1952) is a Yemeni politician and MP. He held the post of Minister of Information from 1996 to 2001.

Biography 
He was born in 1952 in Sana'a. He received his BA in economics from Sana'a University. He has been a GPC MP since 2003. He served as deputy ministers of Information and Culture before his appointment as minister of Information in 1996 and Minster of Youth and Sports in 2001.

References 

1952 births
Information ministers of Yemen
20th-century Yemeni politicians
21st-century Yemeni politicians
People from Sanaa
Members of the House of Representatives (Yemen)
Sanaa University alumni
General People's Congress (Yemen) politicians
Living people